Epic spider is a common name for several spiders from Australia and may refer to:

Selenocosmia crassipes
Selenocosmia stirlingi